The 2010 Texas State Bobcats football team represented Texas State University–San Marcos in the 2010 NCAA Division I FCS football season. The Bobcats were led by fourth year head coach Brad Wright, played their home games at Bobcat Stadium as a member of the Southland Conference. They finished the season with a record of four wins and seven losses (4–7, 1–6 Southland).

Schedule

References

Texas State
Texas State Bobcats football seasons
Texas State Bobcats football